Science and Consciousness Review (SCR) is a website presenting publicly accessible summaries of scientific studies of consciousness and related issues. SCR is one of a number of web resources about the scientific study of consciousness, including the Association for the Scientific Study of Consciousness and the Center for Consciousness Studies of the University of Arizona, Tucson. Scientific journals focused on conscious cognition include the Elsevier journal Consciousness and Cognition. 

Current editors are Bernard J. Baars, Thomas Ramsoy, and Alice Kim. Technical support is provided by Virgil Griffith and Sidney d'Mello. A number of well-known scientists and scholars serve on the Editorial Board, including Ned Block, Stan Franklin, Patricia Churchland, Allan Combs, Walter Freeman, and Christof Koch.

External links

Consciousness studies